The most common side effects of tramadol in order of decreasing incidence are:
Note: Serious adverse effects are in bold.

Very common (>10% frequency) 

 Dizziness
 Nausea
 Constipation
 Vertigo
 Headache
 Vomiting
 Somnolence (drowsiness)

Common (1–10% frequency) 

 Agitation
 Anxiety
 Emotional lability
 Euphoria
 Nervousness
 Spasticity
 Dyspepsia (indigestion)
 Asthenia (weakness)
 Pruritus (itchiness)
 Dry mouth
 Diarrhea
 Fatigue
 Sweating
 Malaise
 Vasodilation (dilation (widening) of blood vessels)
 Confusion
 Coordination disturbance
 Miosis
 Sleep disorder
 Rash
 Hypertonia
 Abdominal pain
 Weight loss
 Visual disturbance
 Flatulence
 Menopausal symptoms
 Urinary frequency
 Urinary retention (being unable to urinate)

Uncommon (0.1-1% incidence) 
 Cardiovascular regulation anomalies (palpitation, tachycardia, postural hypotension or cardiovascular collapse)
 Retching
 Gastrointestinal irritation (a feeling of pressure in the stomach, bloating)
 Urticaria (hives)
 Trembling
 Flushing

Rare (0.01–0.1% incidence) 

 Bradycardia
 Hypertension (high blood pressure)
 Allergic reactions (e.g. dyspnoea (shortness of breath), bronchospasm, wheezing, angioneurotic oedema)
 Anaphylaxis
 Changes in appetite
 Paraesthesia (pins and needles)
 Hallucinations
 Tremor
 Respiratory depression
 Epileptiform convulsions
 Involuntary muscle contractions
 Abnormal coordination
 Syncope (fainting)
 Blurred vision
 Dyspnoea (shortness of breath)
 Tinnitus (ringing in the ears)
 Migraine
 Stevens–Johnson syndrome/toxic epidermal necrolysis (potentially fatal skin reactions)
 Motorial weakness
 Creatinine increase
 Elevated liver enzymes
 Hepatitis (liver swelling)
 Stomatitis (mouth swelling)
 Liver failure
 Pulmonary oedema (fluid in the lungs)
 Gastrointestinal bleeding
 Pulmonary embolism
 Myocardial ischaemia (lack of blood supply to the heart muscles)
 Speech disorders
 Haemoglobin decrease
 Proteinuria (protein in the urine; usually indicative of kidney damage)

References

Tramadol